Winefred Lake 194B is an Indian reserve of the Chipewyan Prairie First Nation in Alberta, located within the Regional Municipality of Wood Buffalo.

References

Indian reserves in Alberta